Anne René Augustin de Roscanvec de La Landelle (6 May 1735 —) was a French Navy officer. He notably captained the 64-gun Bizarre at the Battle of Sadras on 17 February 1782,  at the Battle of Providien on 12 April 1782,  at the Battle of Negapatam on 6 July 1782,  and at the Battle of Trincomalee from 25 August to 3 September 1782.

Biography 
La Landelle-Roscanvec was born to a noble family of Bretagne. He was a nephew of Emmanuel-Auguste de Cahideuc, Comte Dubois de la Motte.

La Landelle-Roscanvec joined the Navy as a Garde-Marine on 17 September 1751. He was promoted to Ensign in 1756, to Lieutenant on 13 March 1764.

On 28 April 1764, he married Suzanne jeanne Armande d'Andigné, at Vannes.

He was promoted to Captain on 13 March 1779.

He commanded the 64-gun Bizarre at the Battle of Sadras on 17 February 1782,  at the Battle of Providien on 12 April 1782,  at the Battle of Negapatam on 6 July 1782,  and at the Battle of Trincomalee from 25 August to 3 September 1782. 

La Landelle-Roscanvec requested to be relieved and left the squadron after the Battle of Trincomalee, embarking on Pulvérisateur on 3 September 1782, bound for Isle de France. 

He was retired from the Navy on 25 July 1784,  and on 31 July 1784, Navy Minister Castrie listed him as one of the six officers who had "conducted themselves badly".

Sources and references 
 Notes

References

 Bibliography
 
 
 
 

French Navy officers